Rollit James Goldring (14 April 1937 – 31 October 2017) was a Canadian basketball player. He competed in the men's tournament at the 1964 Summer Olympics.

References

1937 births
2017 deaths
Basketball players at the 1964 Summer Olympics
Canadian men's basketball players
Olympic basketball players of Canada
Basketball people from Ontario
People from Whitchurch-Stouffville